Iliatenco   is one of the 81 municipalities of Guerrero, in south-western Mexico. The municipal seat lies at Iliatenco. 
In 2005, the municipality had a total population of 10,039 and is the newest of municipalities in Guerrero, formed in 2005

References

Municipalities of Guerrero